The Australia cricket team toured England to play three One Day International (ODI) and three Twenty20 International (T20I) matches in September 2020. The ODI matches formed part of the inaugural 2020–2023 ICC Cricket World Cup Super League. Originally, the matches were scheduled to take place in July 2020, but were moved back to September 2020, due to the COVID-19 pandemic. On 14 August 2020, Cricket Australia named a touring squad of 21 players, after gaining government exemptions to travel to the United Kingdom. The T20Is were played at the Rose Bowl in Southampton, the ODIs were played at Old Trafford in Manchester, with all the fixtures played behind closed doors.

England won the first two T20I matches, winning the series with an unassailable lead. For the third T20I fixture, Moeen Ali captained England for the first time in an international match, after Eoin Morgan suffered a hand injury in the second T20I. Australia went on to win the match by five wickets, with England winning the series 2–1. With their win in the third T20I, Australia finished at the top of the ICC T20I Championship rankings. Australia won the ODI series 2–1. It was the first time in five years that England had lost an ODI series at home, after Australia beat them 3–2 in September 2015.

Background
In May 2020, it was suggested that the dates for the series were moved back to September, to accommodate the rescheduling of the ODI fixtures against Ireland due to the pandemic. Later the same month, Kevin Roberts, the then CEO of Cricket Australia, said that there was still a chance that the series would take place. On 17 June 2020, Cricket Scotland confirmed that their one-off T20I match against Australia had been cancelled. At the time of the cancellation, new dates for Australia's matches against England were in discussion, with both cricket boards working out a revised schedule for September 2020. On 6 July 2020, the England and Wales Cricket Board (ECB) confirmed discussions were still ongoing to host the series. On 16 July 2020, Cricket Australia named a 26-man preliminary squad to begin training ahead of the planned tour to England. On 14 August 2020, Cricket Australia named a squad of 21 players to tour England, with the team departing from Perth on 23 August 2020.

Squads

Australia did not name individual squads for the ODI and T20I matches, opting instead to name a combined squad of 21 players for the tour.

Joe Denly and Saqib Mahmood were named as reserve players for England's ODI squad, with Liam Livingstone and Saqib Mahmood named as reserve players for the T20I squad. On 6 September 2020, Phil Salt was added to England's list of reserve players for the ODI matches. Jos Buttler ruled himself out of England's squad for the third T20I match due to personal reasons. On 9 September 2020, Jason Roy was added to England's ODI squad, with Dawid Malan named as a reserve player for the matches.

Practice matches
Prior to the international matches, Australia trained at the County Cricket Ground in Derby. The team then travelled to Southampton to play intra-squad practice matches at the Rose Bowl. Aaron Finch and Pat Cummins were named as the captains of the two teams, with a cricketer from Hampshire County Cricket Club also included to make the full complement of 22 players. The first warm-up match was scheduled to be 50 overs per side, but was reduced to a 20-over game, after rain was forecast for later in the day. The rain did end the first match early, after 5.5 overs were bowled in the second innings. Conversely, the next practice match was scheduled to be played as a 20-over match, but was changed to a 50-over game. Finally, Australia's squad played two 20-over matches on 1 September 2020, with Aaron Finch's team winning both matches.

T20I series

1st T20I

2nd T20I

3rd T20I

ODI series

1st ODI

2nd ODI

3rd ODI

Notes

References

External links
 Series home at ESPN Cricinfo

2020 in Australian cricket
2020 in English cricket
International cricket competitions in 2020
2020
Cricket events postponed due to the COVID-19 pandemic